Raymond Anthony Brooks (born August 17, 1969) is an American former professional football player who was a running back in the National Football League (NFL). He played college football for the Notre Dame Fighting Irish. He was drafted by the Philadelphia Eagles in the fourth round of the 1992 NFL Draft.

His son, Anthony Barr played college football at UCLA, and was drafted in the first round of the 2014 NFL Draft by the Minnesota Vikings.

References

1969 births
Living people
American football running backs
Notre Dame Fighting Irish football players
Philadelphia Eagles players